William Ralston (19 September 1910 – 7 May 1979) was an Australian rules footballer who played with Melbourne in the Victorian Football League (VFL).

Ralston later served in the Australian Army during World War II.

Notes

External links 

Bill Ralston's playing statistics from The VFA Project

1910 births
Australian rules footballers from Victoria (Australia)
Melbourne Football Club players
Coburg Football Club players
1979 deaths
People from Wodonga
Australian Army personnel of World War II
Military personnel from Victoria (Australia)